Grand Bassa is a county in the west-central portion of the West African nation of Liberia. One of 15 counties that comprise the first-level of administrative division in the nation, it has eight districts. As of the 2008 Census, it had a population of 224,839, making it the fifth most populous county in Liberia.

Grand Bassa's County Superintendent is Janjay Baikpeh. The county is bordered by Margibi County to the northwest, Bong County to the north, Nimba County to the east, and Rivercess County to the south and east. The western part of Grand Bassa borders the Atlantic Ocean.

History
The port of Buchanan was constructed by LAMCO to serve the export of iron ore carried through the railway from Nimba. The civil war destroyed the port, railway and the township built by LAMCO. In 2005, LAMCO's facilities were taken over by Arcelor-Mittal, which has begun a gradual reconstruction. The once bustling port became a ghost town, until the arrival of Arcelor-Mittal and the consequent prospects of employment. Under terms of a 2005 agreement with the national government, Arcelor-Mittal will give $1 million each year to the county for iron ore exploitation, though these terms were revised in 2007.

Notable people from Grand Bassa
Stephen Allen Benson, President of Liberia (1856-1864) 
Joseph James Cheeseman, President of Liberia (1892-1896)
Lewis Penick Clinton, Bassa prince, and missionary
Gbehzohngar Findley, Minister of Foreign Affair (2018–Present) and Former Senate Pro-Tempore (2005-2014)
Anthony Gardiner, President of Liberia (1878-1883)
Jonathan Lambort Kaipay, Senator (2015–Present)
James Skivring Smith, President of Liberia (1871-1872)
James Skivring Smith Jr., Vice President of Liberia (1930-1944)
Etweda Cooper, peace activist and superintendent of Grand Bassa (2012-2015)
Faithvonic, singer and songwriter
Sundaygar Dearboy, singer and songwriter

Districts
Districts of Grand Bassa County include (2008 population):
Commonwealth District (34,270)
District #1 (25,180)
District #2 (28,469)
District #3 (47,721)
District #4 (33,180)
Neekreen District (32,058)
Owensgrove District (13,687)
St. John River District (10,274)

See also
Saint John River

References

External links
Place name codes
Grand Bassa County Association of the Americas

 
Counties of Liberia